An emergency shelter is a place for people to live temporarily when they cannot live in their previous residence, similar to homeless shelters. The main difference is that an emergency shelter typically specializes in people fleeing a specific type of situation, such as natural or man-made disasters, domestic violence, or victims of sexual abuse. A more minor difference is that people staying in emergency shelters are more likely to stay all day, except for work, school, or errands, while homeless shelters usually expect people to stay elsewhere during the day, returning only to sleep or eat. Emergency shelters sometimes facilitate support groups, and/or provide meals.

Post-disaster emergency shelter is often provided by organizations or governmental emergency management departments, in response to natural disasters, such as a flood or earthquake. They tend to use tents or other temporary structures, or buildings normally used for another purpose, such as a church or school. These settlements may be inhabited for the entire duration of the reconstruction process and should be thought of more as settlements than shelter, and need to be planned with respect to water / sanitation, livelihoods.

A newer category of emergency shelter is the warming center. Warming centers typically open during particularly cold or rainy nights. They are available to persons who decline to accept homeless shelters, are not allowed to use homeless shelters, or are not homeless, but have inadequate or malfunctioning heat in their homes.

Mass emergency shelters
One example of a mass emergency shelter is the Louisiana Superdome, which was used as a hurricane shelter during Hurricane Katrina. More than 20,000 storm refugees crowded into the arena seeking sanctuary from the winds and waters of Katrina, filling seats, ramps, corridors, and the artificial turf field. The refugees were met with a myriad of new challenges, including stifling heat, stench, filth, unsanitary facilities, and a shortage of food and drinking water. Violent assaults and rapes were reported, as well as one unconfirmed suicide.

Sustainable design 
Sustainable design is often employed in response to global environmental crises, the rapid growth of economic activity and human population, depletion of natural resources, damage to ecosystems, and loss of biodiversity. In 2013, eco architecture writer Bridgette Meinhold surveyed emergency and long-term sustainable housing projects that were developed in response to these crises in her book Urgent Architecture: 40 Sustainable Housing Solutions for a Changing World. Featured projects focus on green building, sustainable design, eco-friendly materials, affordability, material reuse, and humanitarian relief. Construction methods and materials include repurposed shipping containers, straw bale construction, sandbag homes, and floating homes.

See also
 Civil defense
 Emergency management
 Homeless shelter
 Homelessness
 List of human habitation forms
 Natural disaster
 Warming center

References

External links
 Build A Kit advice from the Department of Homeland Security
 Emergency Shelter Records New-York Historical Society
 Shelter Centre NGO supporting the emergency shelter sector

Disaster preparedness
Emergency services
Temporary populated places